is a Japanese manga series  by Satomi Ikezawa about a Labrador puppy, named Ponta, who turns into a human and falls in love with Mirai Iwaki, who's very popular in his school. In 2000, it won the Kodansha Manga Award for shōjo. It was published in the United States by Del Rey Manga.

Plot

Ponta, the Koizumi family's labrador retriever puppy one day eats the 'talking bone' that the grandfather invented to allow an animal who licks it the power of speech. Instead of just being able to talk however, she transforms into a human girl. When she rushes out into traffic as a girl, she is saved by the most popular boy at school and falls in love with him. To be near him she enrolls in school and tries to learn how to live as a human.

Characters
 Ponta Koizumi — The lead character of the series. Grandpa Koizumi's invention transformed her from a puppy into a small child.
 Mirai Iwaki — A popular and attractive boy at school. 
 Go Fujinaga — A boy who loves animals and is attracted to Ponta.
 Yuka Koizumi — The granddaughter of the transformation bone's creator, Grandfather Koizumi. Yuka initially has a crush on Mirai, but later finds a different boyfriend, and becomes a more minor character. 
 Soichiro Koizumi — Brother to Yuka, who does not feature significantly after volume 1.
 Grandfather Ji Koizumi — Creator of the transformation bone, headteacher of the school attended by the children, and teacher of Ponta.
 Hana Yamaguchi — Mirai's manipulative ex-girlfriend. She is very suspicious of Ponta, and wants to defeat her.

Release
Del Rey licensed Guru Guru Pon-chan for an English-language release in North America and published the volumes from July 26, 2005 to July 31, 2007.
In the United Kingdom, Tanoshimi published Guru Guru Pon-chan from August 3, 2006 to August 2, 2007.

Volume list

References

External links

Guru-Guru Pon-chan Official site by Del Rey Manga

Del Rey Manga
Kodansha manga
Romantic comedy anime and manga
Shōjo manga
Winner of Kodansha Manga Award (Shōjo)